Kim Min-tae (born 26 November 1993)  is a South Korean professional footballer who plays as a centre back for  club Kashima Antlers.

Club statistics
.

Honours
Nagoya Grampus
J.League Cup: 2021

References

External links 
 
 
 Profile at Kashima Antlers

1993 births
Living people
South Korean footballers
J1 League players
Vegalta Sendai players
Hokkaido Consadole Sapporo players
Kashima Antlers players
South Korean expatriate sportspeople in Japan
Footballers at the 2016 Summer Olympics
Olympic footballers of South Korea
Sportspeople from Incheon
Association football defenders